Hugo Crola (30 November 1841, Ilsenburg - 30 June 1910, Blankenburg) was a German portrait, landscape and genre painter, associated with the Düsseldorfer Malerschule.

Life and work 
He was the first of five children born to the landscape painting couple,  (originally Croll). In 1847, his parents bought what is now known as the "Crola-Haus", near Ilsenburg Castle, and that is where he grew up. Despite having so many children, they found time to travel together; visiting Switzerland, Italy, Norway, and several places in Germany. 

He initially devoted himself to architecture; working with Friedrich Hitzig on the construction of the Berlin Stock Exchange. While there, he decided to switch to painting and attended classes at the Kunstakademie Berlin from 1861 to 1862. When the Exchange was completed, he enrolled at the Kunstakademie Düsseldorf, where he studied with Eduard Bendemann and Wilhelm Sohn. During a trip to Engelberg in 1865, Crola painted his first portrait: his father's. 

An altarpiece, commissioned by the Courland Governorate, was his first major work. After winning a gold medal for a self-portrait at the 1873 Vienna World's Fair, he turned almost exclusively to portraits.  Although he painted the likenesses of many aristocratic and wealthy public figures, he is best known for his portraits of his fellow artists. His style was originally based on the old Dutch Masters, but progressed to being more Impressionistic.

In 1877 he became a teacher there, in a class for drawing from living models. From 1878 to 1898, he was a Professor of landscape painting. In 1880, when Hermann Wislicenus was dismissed as the Academy's Director, he became part of a Board, where the title of Director alternated between him, Karl Woermann and Johann Peter Theodor Janssen. By the end of the century, he was one of the best known members of the Düsseldorfer Malerschule, and one of the Academy's most active teachers.

Notable students 

 Arthur Bambridge 
 Georg Burmester 
 Wilhelm Degode 
 Oskar Freiwirth-Lützow
 Otto Heichert 
 Lewis Edward Herzog 
 Meinrad Iten
 Julian Klein von Diepold
 Ants Laikmaa 
 Gari Melchers 
 Peter Philippi 
 Paul Raud 
 Julius Rolshoven
 Wilhelm Schneider-Didam 
 Friedrich Schwinge 
 Alfred Sohn-Rethel
 Carl Strathmann 
 Carl Vinnen 
 Hans von Volkmann 
 Robert Weise

Sources 
 Braunschweigisches Biographisches Lexikon, Vol.I, pg.128
 
 Ekkehard Mai: Die deutschen Kunstakademien im 19. Jahrhundert: Künstlerausbildung zwischen Tradition und Avantgarde. Böhlau Verlag, Cologne, 2010, pg.204
 Zur Geschichte der düsseldorfer Kunst insbesondere im XIX. Jahrhundert. Kunstverein für die Rheinlande und Westfalen, 1902; "Hugo Crola", pp.189, 293, 308, (Online)

External links 

1841 births
1910 deaths
German painters
German portrait painters
Kunstakademie Düsseldorf alumni
Academic staff of Kunstakademie Düsseldorf
People from Ilsenburg